Budiš is a village and municipality in Turčianske Teplice District in the Žilina Region of northern central Slovakia.

History
In historical records, the village was first mentioned in 1573.

Geography
The municipality lies at an altitude of 476 metres and covers an area of 10.275 km². It has a population of about 211 people.

Genealogical resources

The records for genealogical research are available at the state archive "Statny Archiv in Bytca, Slovakia."

 Lutheran church records (births/marriages/deaths): 1784–1896 (parish B)

See also
 List of municipalities and towns in Slovakia

References

External links
Surnames of living people in Budis

Villages and municipalities in Turčianske Teplice District